Rocky Run Methodist Church is a historic Methodist church in Alberta, Brunswick County, Virginia. It was built in 1857, and is a one-story, frame Greek Revival style building.  It has a two-room plan consisting of a narrow narthex and a nave. The front facade features a Roman Doric distyle pedimented porch, which frames the paired, four panel door church entrance. Also on the property is a contributing privy and church cemetery.

It was listed on the National Register of Historic Places in 1995.

References

Methodist churches in Virginia
Greek Revival church buildings in Virginia
Churches completed in 1857
19th-century Methodist church buildings in the United States
Buildings and structures in Brunswick County, Virginia
Churches on the National Register of Historic Places in Virginia
National Register of Historic Places in Brunswick County, Virginia
1857 establishments in Virginia